Andrei Olegovich Svyatov (born 2 May 1993) is a former Russian football player.

Club career
He made his debut in the Russian Professional Football League for FC Spartak-2 Moscow on 22 August 2013 in a game against FC Zvezda Ryazan.

He made his Russian Football National League debut for FC Tom Tomsk on 24 April 2014 in a game against FC Sakhalin Yuzhno-Sakhalinsk.

References

External links
 

1993 births
People from Pervomaiskyi
Living people
Russian footballers
Russia youth international footballers
Association football midfielders
FC Spartak-2 Moscow players
FC Tom Tomsk players
FC Khimik-Arsenal players